Ida Henningsdotter Königsmarck (died 1450), was a Swedish noble and fief-holder, known for her legendary defense of Kastelholm Castle on Åland in Swedish Finland during the Engelbrekt Rebellion in 1433.

She was the daughter of the nobleman Henning Königsmarck (d. c. 1415), a German immigrated nobleman and adviser of King Eric of Pomerania, and the sister of Governor Bengt Königsmarck of Kalmar; she was thus the paternal aunt of Kristina Königsmarck. She married nobleman Tomas Von Vitzen (c. 1381-1416) firstly, and secondly to Bengt Pogwisch (d. 1432). Her second spouse was an adviser of King Eric from Holstein and the holder of the fief Kastelholm Castle, and after his death in 1432, she took over his position as fief-holder.

In 1433, the castle was besieged by the rebels during the Engelbrekt Rebellion. Her defense of the castle was described in the Karlskrönikan ('Charles Chronicle') and became legend:

Fru Yda en utlänsk Qvinna;
Bättre Konenungen henne trodde
Än någon then i Sverige bodde;
Thet var nu Svenskom til spott
At Qvinna skulle råda Riksens Slott

(Lady Ida a foreign woman:
Thought of better by the king
Than any living in Sweden;
This was now when the Swedes decided
That woman be entrusted with the defense of the royal castles)

Other sources claim that her son Otto Pogwisch organized the defense and that he surrendered to the rebels.

References
 Engelbrecht Engelbrechtssons historia, Eric Tundeld, 1784
 Svenskt biografiskt lexikon, band 21.
 Königsmarck, släkter, urn:sbl:11939, Svenskt biografiskt lexikon, hämtad 2017-12-26.
 http://www.wisthbf.se/slott-torp/allmaent/Rosman-BS-del1-281.pdf

1450 deaths
15th-century Swedish nobility
Women in 15th-century warfare
Year of birth unknown
Women in medieval European warfare
Women in war in Sweden
15th-century Swedish women